Jence Ann Rhoads (born 31 December 1988) is an American professional handball player, a member of the United States women's national handball team and  former professional basketball player .

Personal life
Rhoads mother, Melinda Rhoads, played for the United States national handball team for 10 years and was a member of the 1984 U.S. Women's Olympic Handball Team. Her father, Robert Rhoads, is a former professional basketball player who played college basketball at Wake Forest University.

Basketball

College
Rhoads played for Vanderbilt from 2007 to 2011. In 2011, she garnered first-team All-SEC honors and second-team all-conference honors by the Associated Press. She was the only player in the schools history to have at least 1100 points, 500 assists and 400 rebounds.

Vanderbilt statistics

Source

Club career
Rhoads signed with Úrvalsdeild kvenna club Haukar in August 2011. On October 2, 2011, she helped Haukar win the Icelandic Company Cup by defeating Keflavík, 63–61, in the cup finals. In the game, Rhoads had 34 points and 10 rebounds. In the final 16 of the Icelandic Basketball Cup, she scored 6 unanswered points during the last 20 seconds of Haukar's game against KR, sending the game to overtime. She ended having 23 points in Haukar's 78–73 victory. During the Úrvalsdeild playoffs, she helped Haukar sweep defending champions Keflavík in the semi-finals, 3–0, scoring 31 points in the third and deciding game. In the finals, Haukar lost to Njarðvík 3–1. For the season, she led the league with 7.5 assists per game.

Rhoads spent the 2012–2013 season with Sepsi SIC of the Romanian Liga Națională, averaging 11.7 points and 5.8 assists. In August, 2013, Rhoads signed with rivals BC ICIM Arad. She helped ICIM Arad win the Cupa României and finish second in the league. After the season she retired from professional basketball to fully focus on her handball career.

Awards, titles and accomplishments

Individual awards
First-team All-SEC: 2010, 2011

Titles
Cupa României: 2014
Icelandic Company Cup: 2012

Accomplishments
Romanian All-Star: 2014
Úrvalsdeild kvenna assists leader: 2012

Handball
As she went back from Romania in 2014 and she was searching for another basketball club her mother a 1984 Olympian was at the 30th Olympic reunion. There USA Team Handball told her mother about the USA Team Handball Residency Program at the Auburn University. A few months later Rhoads attended the tryouts for the program and was named to the United States women's national handball team in 2014.

In 2015, she helped the team win bronze at the Nor.Ca. Handball Championship.

She has won with Team Rogue which is basically the national team the National Championships twice 2017 and 2018. In 2018 she was the top scorer of the Nationals.

In March 2019 she received a contact to play until the end of the season for the Spanish handball club CB Atlético Guardés with an extension option.

Academic
During her Basketball college career she did at Vanderbilt University a Bachelor in Multi / Interdisciplinary Studies. At the Residency Program at Auburn University she started with a master's degree in Kinesiology and Exercise Science which she finished in 2015. In 2016 she started on a PhD in Kinesiology.

References

External links
Profile at teamusa.org
Icelandic statistics at kki.is
Romanian statistics at frbaschet.ro
Profile at eurobasket.com
College Bio at vucommodores.com
WNBA Prospect profile

1988 births
Living people
American expatriate basketball people in Iceland
American expatriate basketball people in Romania
American female handball players
American women's basketball players
Point guards
Úrvalsdeild kvenna basketball players
Vanderbilt Commodores women's basketball players
Haukar women's basketball players
American expatriate sportspeople in Spain
Handball players at the 2019 Pan American Games
Pan American Games competitors for the United States